Jujubinus augustoi is an endemic species of sea snail, a marine gastropod mollusk in the family Trochidae, the top snails.

Distribution
This species occurs in the Atlantic Ocean off São Tomé and Príncipe in the island of São Tomé

References

Further reading
Rolán E. & Gori S. (2009). Two new species of the genera Jujubinus and Mitrella (Mollusca, Prosobranchia) from Sao Tomé Island. Gloria Maris 48(1): 10-16.

augustoi
Endemic fauna of São Tomé and Príncipe
Invertebrates of São Tomé and Príncipe
Fauna of São Tomé Island
Gastropods described in 2009